In Nomine Aeternitatis is the second studio album by the Austrian neoclassical dark wave band Dargaard. It was released on 28 November 2000 on Napalm Records.

The music is performed in melancholic dark mood with romantic elements and symphonized sounds. Unlike the first album in which Tharen had substantial hold on the singing, in this one he mostly left the vocals to Elisabeth. The songs were composed and programmed at Stronghold Dargaard during the years of 1998 and 1999 and recorded, mixed and mastered by Georg Hrauda and Tharen at Tonstudio Hoernix in 1999.

In Nomine Aeternitatis means In the Name of Eternity in Latin.

Track listing

Credits
Tharen – all instruments, vocals
Elisabeth Toriser – singing|vocals

References

External links
Hear sample song The March of Shadows

2000 albums
Dargaard albums
Neoclassical dark wave albums
Dark ambient albums
Napalm Records albums